Chakkol (also Romanized as Chak Gol) is a village in Margan Rural District, in the Central District of Hirmand County, Sistan and Baluchestan Province, Iran. At the 2006 census, its population was 485, in 97 families.

References 

Populated places in Hirmand County